Gus Dahlström (6 November 1906 – 25 December 1989) was a Swedish film actor. He appeared in more than 60 films between 1942 and 1984.

Partial filmography

 Olycksfågeln nr 13 (1942) - Gurra (uncredited)
 Kvinnan tar befälet (1942) - 'Kurre' (uncredited)
 Rattens musketörer (1945) - Salesman (uncredited)
 13 stolar (1945) - Drunk (uncredited)
 Crisis (1946) - Tuba Player (uncredited)
 91:an Karlsson (1946) - 91:an 'Mandel' Karlsson
 Kronblom (1947) - 91 Karlsson (uncredited)
 Private Karlsson on Leave (1947) - 91:an 'Mandel' Karlsson
 Bohus Battalion (1949) - 116 Kålle Götlund
 Knockout at the Breakfast Club (1950) - Gus
 Påhittiga Johansson (1950) - Pratt
 Det var en gång en sjöman (1951) - Korten
 91:an Karlssons bravader (1951) - 91:an 'Mandel' Karlsson
 69:an, sergeanten och jag (1952) - Waldemar Johansson
 The Green Lift (1952) - Gus
 Åsa-Nisse on Holiday (1953, Writer)
 Alla tiders 91:an Karlsson (1953) - 91:an Karlsson
 Speed Fever (1953) - Comic Actor
 Bror min och jag (1953) - Gus
 Laugh Bomb (1954) - Gus
 Flottans muntergökar (1955) - Halvard
 Bröderna Östermans bravader (1955) - Skärgårdsbo (uncredited)
 Åsa-Nisse in Military Uniform (1958) - 107:an
 Åsa-Nisse slår till (1965) - Gus
 Åsa-Nisse i raketform (1966) - Jönsson
 Drra på - kul grej på väg till Götet (1967) - Policeman
 Åsa-Nisse i agentform (1967) - Jönsson
 Åsa-Nisse och den stora kalabaliken (1968) - Jönsson
 Pappa varför är du arg? Du gjorde likadant själv när du var ung (1968) - Johansson
 Freddy klarar biffen (1968) - Gardener
 Out of an Old Man's Head (1968) - Bensinstationsföreståndare
 Dagmars Heta Trosor (1971) - House Painter
 Emil i Lönneberga (1971) - Stolle-Jocke
 The Apple War (1971) - Filmregissörn
 Andersson's Kalle (1972) - Möller
 Smutsiga fingrar (1973) - Squiffed man at crime-scene
 Bröllopet (1973) - Erik Eriksson
 Andersson's Kalle on Top Form (1973) - School Janitor
 Kom till Casino! (1975)
 The Man on the Roof (1976) - Mr. Eriksson
 Drömmen om Amerika (1976) - Deaf Man
 SOPOR (1981) - Subway Manager (uncredited)
 Fanny and Alexander (1982) - Props Man - Teatern
 Rosen (1984) - Erik

References

External links

1906 births
1989 deaths
People from Ljusdal Municipality
Swedish male film actors
20th-century Swedish male actors